Section Sanguineae is a section within the genus Crataegus native to central and eastern Europe and parts of Asia. It includes about 20 species and three series.

Series
Series in section Sanguineae include:

 Altaicae
 Nigrae
 Sanguineae

See also
 List of hawthorn species with black fruit
 List of hawthorn species with yellow fruit

References

Section Douglasia
Flora of North America
Flora of Asia
Plant sections